Kitenge is a surname. Notable people with the surname include:

 Aime Kitenge (born 1975), Burundian football player
 Gabriel Kitenge, Congolese and Katangese politician
 Joël Kitenge (born 1987), Luxembourgian football player

Surnames of African origin